Juggalo Championship Wrestling (JCW) is a professional wrestling promotion based in Novi, Michigan. Employees in JCW consist of professional wrestlers, managers, play-by-play and color commentators, ring announcers, interviewers, referees, trainers, script writers and various other positions. Executives and board of directors are also listed.

Employees and management are organized by role within the promotion. the ring name of the employee is written on the left, while the employee's real name is on the right.

The executive officers section refers to the employees that handle the everyday demands of the company. Employees that fit in this section are producers and other senior officials. Creative Writers or Script Writers are the employees that write the storylines, segments, and make the matches for each event and internet episode of JCW's internet program SlamTV!.

Roster

Male wrestlers

Female wrestlers

Other on-air talent

Company officials

Executive officers

Referees

Other personnel

See also
List of Juggalo Championship Wrestling alumni
List of professional wrestlers

References

External links
Official JCW website

Juggalo Championship Wrestling
Juggalo Championship Wrestling employees
Novi, Michigan